Nicrophorus investigator is a burying beetle first described by the Swedish naturalist Johan Wilhelm Zetterstedt in 1824.

References

 [ Sikes et al. 2002]

Silphidae
Beetles described in 1824
Beetles of  Europe
Beetles of North America
Taxa named by Johan Wilhelm Zetterstedt